The Shanghai–Luchaogang Expressway, commonly referred to as the Hulu Expressway and designated S2, is a  in the city of Shanghai, China. The entire route runs within Pudong New Area in the city of Shanghai, and was originally designated A2.

Route 
The Shanghai–Luchaogang Expressway runs in Pudong New Area for its entirety. It begins at the Outer Ring Yingbin Expressway Interchange, an interchange with S1 Yingbin Expressway and S20 Outer Ring Expressway. It travels southward, meeting the Shanghai–Jiaxing–Huzhou Expressway, and then curves southeastward to meet the G1503 Shanghai Ring Expressway. It ends at Lingang New City on the southeastern coast of Shanghai, just before the Donghai Bridge. The Donghai Bridge connects Shanghai to Yangshan Port, a deep-water port administered by Shengsi County, Zhoushan, Zhejiang in Hangzhou Bay.

Exit list

References 

Expressways in Shanghai